Stock car, referring to a production car, usually refers to Stock car racing.

Stock car may also refer to:
 Stock car (rail), wagon used for carrying livestock
 Stock Car (film), 1955 British crime drama
 Stock Car (video game), released in 1984
 Stock Car Racing (magazine), U.S. magazine since 1966
 Stock Car Races, Canadian sports television series
 Stock Car Light
 Stock Car Brasil